Veeranadai is a 2000 Tamil-language action drama film, directed by Seeman, starring Sathyaraj, Khushbu and Uma. The film had musical score by Deva.

Plot
The story revolves around two village bigwigs, Periya Karuppan and Kottaisamy. Periya Karuppan, a kind hearted person, is very helpful to his villagers. Kottaisamy, on the other hand, is always jealous of Periya Karuppan and his father.

Periya Karuppan is very affectionate towards his sister and he gives her in marriage to a young man. After giving birth to a beautiful girl, the couple get killed in an accident. Periya Karuppan brings up the girl Poomayil and vows not to marry as he has to look after his niece. This disappoints Mallika who wants to marry Periya Karuppan.

When Poomayil attains marriageable age, a young man is chosen to marry her. Before the day of betrothal she asks her grandfather why her uncle never got married and the old man replies that he has remained a bachelor only to bring her up. This touches her and she announces at the betrothal function that she intends to marry only her uncle, who has sacrificed a lot for her sake.

Cast
Sathyaraj as Periya Karuppan
Khushbu as Mallika
Uma as Poomayil
C. Arunpandian as Kottaisamy
Goundamani as Ulagavaayan
Senthil
Chandrasekhar
Ponvannan
Sabitha Anand
Crane Manohar

Soundtrack
The soundtrack was composed by Deva.

References

2000 films
2000s Tamil-language films
Indian action drama films
Films scored by Deva (composer)
2000 action drama films
Films directed by Seeman